Dianella may refer to:

 Dianella (beetle), a species and genus of beetle in the family Carabidae now known as Diamella
 Dianella (gastropod), a genus of freshwater snails in the family Hydrobiidae
 Dianella (plant), a genus of flowering plants
 Dianella, Western Australia, a suburb of Perth, Australia
 Dianella White Eagles, a football club from the suburb